USP may refer to:

Government institutions
 Unité Spéciale de la Police, Luxembourg
 United States Penitentiary, a prison
 Utah State Prison, Draper,  US

Math and science
 Ultra-short period planets, orbiting planets with periods shorter than one day.
 Ultraspiracle protein, a part of the ecdysone receptor
 Universal stress protein, a protein superfamily
 USp (2n), a symplectic group in the mathematics of group theory
 USP grade, a level of chemical purity

Technology
 United States patent
 Heckler & Koch USP pistol
 Ultrashort pulse laser, a laser that emits ultrashort pulses of light, generally of the order of femtoseconds to hundreds of femtoseconds
 Universal Storage Platform, brand name for a Hitachi Data Systems line of enterprise storage arrays
 Unified shader processors, used in GPUs
 USP (Victoria), a Russian satellite bus

Universities
 University of São Paulo, a public university in Brazil
 University of the Sciences in Philadelphia, United States
 University of the South Pacific, a public university with a number of locations in Oceania
 University of Southeastern Philippines, an educational institution in Mindanao, Philippines
 University of Southern Philippines Foundation, an educational institution in Cebu, Philippines
 University Scholars Program, a scholarly community at Duke University; see John Hope Franklin Center for Interdisciplinary and International Studies

Other uses
 Unified settlement planning
 Unique selling proposition/Unique selling point, in marketing
 United States Pharmacopeia
 Urs Samyuktha Paksha, an Indian political party
 Useful space principle, in the game of bridge
 Uttama Seva Padakkama, a military decoration in Sri Lanka
 Uspantek language (ISO 639 code: usp), a Mayan language